Second Baptist Church Houston is a Baptist multi-site megachurch in Houston, Texas, US. It is affiliated with the Southern Baptist Convention and the Southern Baptists of Texas Convention.

History
Second Baptist Church was founded in 1927 when 121 people met at the old Taylor School in downtown Houston. A year later, it acquired its first permanent facility when it moved to the former St. Paul's Methodist Church on Milam and McGowen streets in downtown.

In 1946, the church sponsored foundation of the Second Baptist School as a self-supporting agency. The school occupies a  campus in the Memorial area and is open to students without regard to religion or economic background.

In 1957, Second Baptist moved west to the current main location, now the Woodway Campus, on Woodway Drive and Voss Road. The church hoped to reach families in the already fast-growing western portion of Houston. The Woodway Campus boasts the largest all-pipe Rodgers organ ever built, with 192 stops and 10,412 total pipes, qualifying the instrument as one of the largest pipe organs in the world. Although it was silenced for about a year due to severe water damage inflicted by Hurricane Ike in 2008, the organ is played weekly in the church's traditional worship services, as well as for concerts and special events. In addition to repairing the organ, the extensive damage from the hurricane required the church's Worship Center to be repaired and remodeled. It contains seating for 5,500.

In 1979, the church launched a weekly broadcast of worship services on local television. In 1982, a local radio program began, as well as national TV broadcasting known as The Winning Walk. Since then this has expanded into international television, radio and internet distribution of the church's message.

A 2008 survey by Outreach magazine gave attendance at 23,659. In 2009, average weekly attendance was 22,723, making it one of the nation's largest churches. Also , the church's annual budget was $53 million.

In 2010, Second Baptist Church brought on the best selling Christian book author, Gary Thomas, as a writer in residence. Thomas also serves on Second's teaching team.

On Easter day in 2012, the church began Spanish-language services.

Expansion

In 1999, Second Baptist opened its West Campus with a 4,500-seat worship center and separate buildings for educational programs, weddings, funerals, and other events. It includes a  classroom facility as well as other meeting spaces. In 2004, Forest Cove Baptist Church joined Second Baptist and was renamed the North Campus, and satellite campuses in Pearland and Cypress were established in 2006, along with the addition of the 1463 campus in Fulshear in 2015. Together, Second Baptist Church consists of six physical campuses. 

Under the leadership of Ed Young, the church grew from an average weekend attendance of 500 in 1978 to over 24,000 in 2009. In addition to worship facilities it "has fitness centers, bookstores, information desks, a café, a K-12 school and free automotive repair service for single mothers."

In 2016, Second Baptist Church in cooperation with Community of Faith Church, developed and launched Loving Kids, a ministry in which three Houston elementary schools were adopted "to help support children by way of mentors, tutors and teacher assistants."

In 2018, it has a membership of over 80,000 . Its senior pastor is Ed Young.

Second Baptist has a counseling center, offering "biblical guidance and professional counseling".

See also
 Megachurches
 List of the largest churches in the USA
 Christianity in Houston

References

Churches in Houston
Evangelical megachurches in the United States
Megachurches in Texas
Baptist churches in Texas
Christian organizations established in 1927
1927 establishments in Texas
Southern Baptist Convention churches
Baptist multisite churches